The Final Fantasy Crystal Chronicles video game series consists of Crystal Chronicles, a spin-off of the main Final Fantasy series, its sequels My Life as a King and My Life as a Darklord, and their spin-offs, Ring of Fates, Echoes of Time and The Crystal Bearers. Crystal Chronicles, Ring of Fates, and Echoes of Time have had released soundtrack albums to date, and Crystal Chronicles and Ring of Fates each have an associated single. Kumi Tanioka is the main composer for the series, having composed the three released soundtracks as well as the music for My Life as a King and My Life as a Darklord. Hidenori Iwasaki is filling that role for The Crystal Bearers.  Nobuo Uematsu, the main composer for the regular Final Fantasy series, contributed one track to the Ring of Fates soundtrack. Yae and Donna Burke sang the Japanese and English versions of the theme song for Crystal Chronicles, respectively, while Aiko sang the theme song for Ring of Fates.

Final Fantasy Crystal Chronicles Original Soundtrack was released by Pony Canyon in 2003, as was its single, "Kaze no Ne", and a promotional album Final Fantasy Crystal Chronicles - A Musical Journey.  Final Fantasy Crystal Chronicles: Ring of Fates Original Soundtrack and the double A-side "Hoshi no Nai Sekai"/"Yokogao" were released by Pony Canyon in 2007. The latest release is that of Final Fantasy Crystal Chronicles: Echoes of Time Original Soundtrack by Square Enix in 2009. All the albums and the singles received generally positive reviews, although the Crystal Chronicles album was the most universally appreciated of the three soundtracks.  Unlike the soundtracks to the numbered Final Fantasy games, no compositions from the Crystal Chronicles soundtracks have appeared in any compilation albums produced by Square Enix or any official Final Fantasy concerts. "Morning Sky", the opening theme for Crystal Chronicles, was played in the first Games in Concert performance in Utrecht, Netherlands on November 26, 2006.

Creation and influence 

Kumi Tanioka has described the musical style for the soundtrack to Final Fantasy Crystal Chronicles as being based on "ancient instruments". She says that the idea came to her while looking at illustrations of the game world, which gave her the idea of making "world music", where the tracks would "not [be] limited to a single country or culture". She also credits Hidenori Iwasaki, the synthesizer operator for the game, with doing "fantastic technical work" that brought her vision to life. For the soundtrack to Ring of Fates, Tanioka purposefully did not focus on "world music", instead focusing on "creating a new landscape containing the same atmosphere". The piano performances in the Ring of Fates soundtrack were done by Kumi Tanioka. She did the performances herself rather than use an outside performer as most Final Fantasy soundtracks have done primarily because she "likes to play piano", and were done without any sheet music, as she preferred instead to improvise. She took extensive piano lessons as a child, and lists piano and choral music as the biggest influences on her musical style.  She also claims to have been influenced by music from a wide variety of cultures, such as Indonesian, Irish and Balinese music. She did not compose the soundtrack for The Crystal Bearers; this role was instead performed by Hidenori Iwasaki.

Tanioka has said that in composing the soundtrack for Echoes of Time she tried to "paint the world in an ethnic manner once again". She has said that she tried throughout the soundtracks of the first four Crystal Chronicles games to "maintain a common atmosphere between each installment, [but] always introduce a new concept". With Echoes of Time Tanioka wanted to go back to the "tribal" concept of the original Crystal Chronicles. She has said in regards to the soundtrack that "instead of the traditional sound endemic to the specific areas, I wanted to use them as one flavor and blend many colors just like Final Fantasy Crystal Chronicles" and that many of the tracks she created would be "actually impossible to perform" in real life.

Albums

Final Fantasy Crystal Chronicles Original Soundtrack 

Final Fantasy Crystal Chronicles Original Soundtrack is the soundtrack album of Final Fantasy Crystal Chronicles, containing the majority of the musical tracks from the game, and was composed by Kumi Tanioka. It was released on the Pony Canyon label on August 20, 2003. The album did not include the English versions of the opening song, "Sound of the Wind" and the ending theme, "Moonless Starry Night", all sung by Donna Burke. The style of the music on this album is not defined, but was described by Kumi Tanioka as being based on "ancient instruments". The soundtrack has extensive use of many medieval and Renaissance musical instruments such as the recorder, the crumhorn and the lute, creating a distinctively rustic feel, and also follows the practices and styles of medieval music. The soundtrack spans 52 tracks over 2 discs, covering a duration of 2:11:38, and has the catalog number PCCG-00613.

Final Fantasy Crystal Chronicles: A Musical Journey was a European promotional album which was given alongside the game on March 11, 2004 if the game had been pre-ordered. It contains six tracks from the soundtrack, including "Kaze no Ne" in both Japanese and English, the only time the English version has been released. It was published by Nintendo of Europe, and covers a duration of 17:37.

Final Fantasy Crystal Chronicles Original Soundtrack sold over 5,800 copies. It was well received; Daniel Space of RPGFan praised it, saying that "the music is fun, extremely well written and interesting to hear". He enjoyed the alternative instruments used in the tunes, calling them "successful in providing imagery of renaissance times", although he felt that much more of them would have begun to drag the soundtrack down. Chris of Square Enix Music Online also enjoyed the soundtrack, although he noted that it was "not for everyone". He did, however, feel that the constant use of Renaissance-themed music resulted in a "lack of diversity of styles" that made several of the tracks "bland and indistinctive". Jared of Square Enix Music Online was more enthusiastic about the soundtrack, terming it "a stunning soundtrack full of feeling and emotion" and praising its "unique" style.  As a promotional album, Final Fantasy Crystal Chronicles - A Musical Journey was not as noted by critics. Jared felt that it was "a decent look into the soundtrack of Crystal Chronicles", but not as good of a sampler disc as it could have been due to the track selection.

Track listing

Final Fantasy Crystal Chronicles: Ring of Fates Original Soundtrack 
Final Fantasy Crystal Chronicles: Ring of Fates Original Soundtrack is the soundtrack album of Final Fantasy Crystal Chronicles: Ring of Fates, containing all of the musical tracks from the game, and was composed and produced by Kumi Tanioka. The ending theme song for the game, was sung by Aiko, though it was not included in the album, and Nobuo Uematsu contributed one track to the soundtrack. The soundtrack continues the musical theme of "ancient instruments" prevalent in the Crystal Chronicles soundtrack, but additionally incorporates more modern orchestral instruments such as string and horn pieces.  The tracks on the album cover a wide range of emotional themes, from "joyful and whimsical tracks" to "lugubrious emotional tracks" to "bombastic battle tracks". In keeping with the lighthearted nature of the game, any darker-themed tracks are exaggerated to make them less serious. The soundtrack spans 57 tracks, covering a duration of 1:16:06. It was released on September 19, 2007 in Japan by Square Enix bearing the catalog number SQEX-10101. The single for Hoshi no Nai Sekai, released in 2007, sold 112,000 copies and reached #2 on the Oricon singles chart.

Ring of Fates was well received by reviewers; Neal Chandran of RPGFan, although finding the original soundtrack to be "bland", felt that the Crystal Chronicles soundtrack was "quite varied, exciting, and dare I say really freaking good" and praised the variety of styles and moods of the tracks. Chris was also enthusiastic about the soundtrack, praising it as "one of the finest accompaniments to a Final Fantasy game ever produced". He noted, however, that the soundtrack works best as a "flowing" work or accompaniment to the game, with a lack of individual tracks that stood out as memorable. Don of Square Enix Music Online was much harsher towards the soundtrack, terming it an "extremely underwhelming album". He disapproved of the change from the medieval instrumentation to a more orchestral score, and felt that the pieces had much less emotional intensity than the Crystal Chronicles soundtrack.

Final Fantasy Crystal Chronicles: Echoes of Time Original Soundtrack 
Final Fantasy Crystal Chronicles: Echoes of Time Original Soundtrack is the soundtrack album of Final Fantasy Crystal Chronicles: Echoes of Time, containing the majority of the musical tracks from the game, and was composed by Kumi Tanioka. It was released by Square Enix on February 18, 2009. Like previous Crystal Chronicles soundtracks, Echoes incorporates a variety of instruments, including oboes, xylophones, marimbas and Latin guitars. Unlike the previous Crystal Chronicles soundtracks, the Echoes does not include a theme song. The soundtrack spans 51 tracks over 2 discs, covering a duration of 2:07:30, and has the catalog numbers SQEX-10137~8.

Track listing

Final Fantasy Crystal Chronicles: The Crystal Bearers Original Soundtrack 
Final Fantasy Crystal Chronicles: The Crystal Bearers Original Soundtrack is the soundtrack album of Final Fantasy Crystal Chronicles: Crystal Bearers, containing the majority of the musical tracks from the game, composed by Hidenori Iwasaki and Ryo Yamazaki, with the vocal talent of Donna Burke. The soundtrack spans 70 tracks over 2 discs.

Track listing

Piano Collections
On April 7, 2021, Square Enix released Piano Collections Final Fantasy Crystal Chronicles to correspond with the release of the remastered edition of  Final Fantasy Crystal Chronicles. The ten-track, 40:38 album contains piano arrangements by Kumi Tanioka of her compositions for the game, performed by Tanioka with accompaniment by Yui Morishita on four duets. Patrick Gann of RPGFan heavily praised the album, particularly the duets.

Singles

Kaze no Ne 

 is the opening song of Final Fantasy Crystal Chronicles, composed by Kumi Tanioka and performed by Yae. The single was released on July 30, 2003, has a length of 14:12, and has a catalog number of PCCA-01915. While "Kaze No Ne" follows the medieval theme of the rest of the Crystal Chronicles soundtrack, the arranged version is a more "produced" techno-sounding track. The two unrelated tracks are vocal and instrumental pieces, with "Carol" as a scat song, and "Flower of Love" more of a slower "ethnic/world" piece.

Patrick Gann of RPGFan called "Kaze no Ne" one of the few singles he had purchased that was "worth holding onto".  He described all of the tracks as "beautiful", and felt that the arranged version of "Sound of the Wind" was "charming and enigmatic". Dave of Square Enix Music Online concurred, calling the single "a potentially excellent addition to anyone's discography".  He described Yae's voice as "angelic" "mature" and "fresh" and summed up the album as "a definitive Yae experience accessible to game music fans".

Hoshi no Nai Sekai / Yokogao 
The single is performed by Aiko. All of the songs are primarily focused on the vocals along with piano and electric guitar accompaniments. "A World Without Stars" is a primarily piano-based song with lyrics in Japanese, while "Profile" and "Love" are mid-tempo pop songs. The album was released on August 22, 2007 by Pony Canyon, covers a duration of 24:40, and has the catalog number PCCA-02546.

Neal Chandran approved of "Hoshi no Nai Sekai" / "Yokogao", finding it to be enjoyable despite its short length. He felt that "A World Without Stars" was a "terrific piece, and that the other two songs, while "not as strong", were "still decent tracks that were easy on the ears", and approved of the instrumental versions included in the single. Don also appreciated the soundtrack, calling it "a nice choice" and saying that it "complements a rather weak original soundtrack".  He felt that the balance in the songs between the piano and electric guitar was well done.

Legacy 
Unlike the soundtracks to the numbered Final Fantasy games, no songs from the Crystal Chronicles soundtracks have appeared in any compilation albums produced by Square Enix. Songs from the series have also not appeared in any of the official Final Fantasy music concerts, although "Morning Sky" from the Crystal Chronicles soundtrack was played in the first Games in Concert performance in Utrecht, Netherlands on November 26, 2006.  It was performed by Floor Jansen of the band After Forever and the Metropole Orchestra.

See also

References

External links 
 Official Kumi Tanioka Site
 Official Final Fantasy Crystal Chronicles Original Soundtrack home page at Pony Canyon
 Final Fantasy Crystal Chronicles: Ring of Fates Original Soundtrack home page at Square Enix

Final Fantasy Crystal Chronicles
Crystal Chronicles
Final Fantasy Crystal Chronicles